KOCM (channel 46) is a religious television station licensed to Norman, Oklahoma, United States, serving the Oklahoma City area as an owned-and-operated station of the Daystar Television Network. The station's offices and master control facilities are located on 72nd Avenue Northeast in Norman, and its transmitter is located near the John Kilpatrick Turnpike/I-44 in northeast Oklahoma City.

The station first signed on the air in 2003, and was built and signed on by Daystar through Word of God Fellowship.

Technical information

Subchannels
The station's digital signal is multiplexed:

Analog-to-digital conversion
Because it was granted an original construction permit after the Federal Communications Commission (FCC) finalized the DTV allotment plan on April 21, 1997, the station did not receive a companion channel for a digital television station. Instead, at the end of the digital conversion period for full-service television stations, KOCM was required to turn off its analog signal and turn on its digital signal (called a "flash-cut"). KOCM discontinued regular programming on its analog signal, over UHF channel 46, on June 12, 2009, as part of the federally mandated transition from analog to digital television. The station "flash-cut" its digital signal into operation UHF channel 46.

References

External links
 

Television channels and stations established in 2003
2003 establishments in Oklahoma
OCM
Daystar (TV network) affiliates